Charles Dayan (July 8, 1792 – December 25, 1877) was an American lawyer and politician. From 1831 to 1833, he served one term in the  U.S. House of Representatives from the state of New York.

Early life 
After graduating from Lowville Academy, Dayan became a teacher.

War of 1812 
He was commissioned a lieutenant colonel in the War of 1812.

Career 
Afterwards he studied law, was admitted to the bar in 1817, and practiced in Lowville.

State politics 
He was a member of the New York State Senate (5th D.) from 1827 to 1828, sitting in the 50th and 51st New York State Legislatures. He was President pro tempore of the State Senate and Acting Lieutenant Governor of New York from October 17 to December 31, 1828.

Presidential elector 
Dayan was a presidential elector in 1828, voting for Andrew Jackson and John C. Calhoun.

Congress 
He was elected as a Jacksonian to the 22nd United States Congress, holding office from March 4, 1831, to March 3, 1833.

After Congress 
He was a member of the New York State Assembly (Lewis Co.) in 1835 and 1836.

From 1840 to 1845, he was District Attorney of Lewis County. 

He retired from public life because of ill health, but continued the practice of law.

Death 
He died on December 25, 1877, and was buried at Lowville Rural Cemetery.

Sources

 Political Graveyard

1792 births
1877 deaths
Lieutenant Governors of New York (state)
Members of the New York State Assembly
New York (state) state senators
County district attorneys in New York (state)
1828 United States presidential electors
People from Amsterdam, New York
Jacksonian members of the United States House of Representatives from New York (state)
19th-century American politicians
People from Lowville, New York
Members of the United States House of Representatives from New York (state)